Brasher is a surname.

People
Notable people with the surname include:

Charles Brasher, Canadian inventor
Chris Brasher (1928–2003), British athlete
Shirley Brasher (born 1934), British tennis player
Suzie Brasher, American figure skater
Tim Brasher, Australian rugby league player

Fictional characters
 Julia Brasher, a rookie cop assigned to the Hollywood Division who becomes involved with Harry Bosch